Glenn Bourke  (born 11 November 1960) is an Australian sailor. He competed in the Finn event at the 1992 Summer Olympics.

References

External links
 

1960 births
Living people
Australian male sailors (sport)
Olympic sailors of Australia
Sailors at the 1992 Summer Olympics – Finn
Sailors from Sydney